John Terence Reese (28 August 1913 – 29 January 1996) was a British bridge player and writer.  Regarded as one of the finest players, he was also one of the most influential and acerbic of bridge writers, with a large output, including several books which remain in print as classics of bridge play. He was also the long-time bridge correspondent of The Lady, The Observer, the London Evening News and the Evening Standard.

References

External links
  (including 8 "from old catalog")

Contract bridge books
Contract bridge writers
Bibliographies by writer